The following special routes exist or existed parallel to U.S. Route 87 (US 87) in Texas, primarily along former alignments. They are varyingly designated by the Texas Department of Transportation (TxDOT) as business routes of US 87, state highway loops and spurs, and business loops of Interstate 27 (I-27).

Stockdale

Business U.S. Highway 87-U is the old route of US 87 through Stockdale. It was formed on May 31, 1965 as Loop 411, but always marked as a business route of US 87; On June 21, 1990 the official designation was changed to Business US 87.

La Vernia

Loop 321 is the old route of US 87 through La Vernia, formed in on July 16, 1957.

San Antonio

Spur 345 is the old route of US 87 through northern San Antonio, formed on January 26, 1962, as Loop 345. It begins at I-10/US 87 at Woodlawn Avenue, and runs northwest on Fredericksburg Road to I-10/US 87 near Huebner Road. When first designated, Loop 345 was marked as a business route of US 87. On December 18, 2014, the section of Loop 345 from I-410 south to I-10 was removed from the state highway system, and the rest was redesignated as Spur 345.

Boerne

Business US Highway 87 follows the old route of US 87 through Boerne. It runs along Main Street, east of the I-10/US 87 freeway, between exits 542 and 537. It intersects SH 46 in downtown Boerne and has junctions with RM 474 and RM 1376. While signed as a business route, it is not officially designated as such by TxDOT; the agency considers the route through Boerne to be mainline US 87.

Comfort

Business US Highway 87 follows the old route of US 87 through Comfort. Beginning at exit 524 of northbound I-10/US 87 freeway, it runs northwest along Front Street, concurrent with SH 27. Two routes separate, with SH 27 heading west while Business US 87 turns to the north, reaching a junction with RM 473 in downtown Comfort. It reaches its northern terminus at I-10 exit 523, which is where US 87 separates from the Interstate and heads north. While signed as a business route, it is not officially designated as such by TxDOT; the agency considers the route through Comfort to be mainline US 87.

Big Spring

Business US Highway 87-M follows the old route of US 87 through Big Spring. The highway was designated in 2013 with the construction of a new expressway route for US 87 around the town. The expressway south of I-20 opened to traffic in 2016 while the northern section is currently under construction.

Junction list

Vick

Loop 577 is the old route of US 87 through Vick, formed October 6, 1991. About midway, it intersects the south end of FM 381.

Wall

Loop 570 is the old route of US 87 through Wall, formed on March 19, 1990.

Lamesa

Business U.S. Highway 87-K is the old route of US 87 through Lamesa. It was formed on December 10, 1946 as Loop 218 on Lynn Avenue. On June 21, 1990 the official designation was changed to Business US 87, and on January 2, 1992, US 87 and Business US 87 were swapped, placing the former on Lynn Avenue and the latter on Dallas Avenue.

Tahoka

Loop 472 is the old route of US 87 through Tahoka, formed on January 31, 1969.

Woodrow

Loop 493 is located in Lubbock County. It is a former routing of US 87 through the community of Woodrow.

Loop 493 begins at US 87 south of Woodrow. It travels to the north, paralleling US 87 to its east. In Woodrow, the route passes Lubbock-Cooper High School at Woodrow Road. Loop 493 then curves back to the north and ends at another point on US 87.

Loop 493 was designated on October 2, 1970, when US 87 was upgraded between Lubbock and Tahoka and moved to the east of Woodrow. It was originally signed as a business route of US 87.

Lubbock

Business U.S. Highway 87-G was the old route of US 87 through Lubbock, formed in mid-1992 when Interstate 27 was completed and US 87 was moved onto it. The highway traveled along Avenue A, beginning at a junction with I-27 / US 87 / US 84, running northward to a junction with I-27 / US 87 / US 82.

On February 25, 2010, Business U.S. Highway 87-G was cancelled, and TxDOT transferred ownership of the road to the city of Lubbock.

Junction list

New Deal

Loop 461 is the former route of US 87 in New Deal. It was designated on February 29, 1968, and was originally signed as a business route of US 87. Its southern terminus is at I-27/US 87 exit 13. It runs north along two-lane, undivided Monroe Avenue, to the west of a BNSF Railway line. The highway crosses FM 1729 (Main Street) before reaching its northern terminus at I-27/US 87 exit 15.

Abernathy

Loop 369 is the former alignment of US 87 in Abernathy, It was designated on September 25, 1962. Its southern terminus is at exit 20 of I-27/US 87 in the Lubbock County portion of the city. It heads north-northwest on South Avenue D before curving north, reaching an intersection with FM 597. After crossing into Hale County, Loop 369 reaches its northern terminus at exit 22 of I-27/US 87 in the northern part of the city.

Hale Center

Business Interstate 27-T is the old route of US 87 through Hale Center.

Plainview

Business Interstate 27-U is the old route of US 87 through Plainview. It was previously Loop 445.

Amarillo

Loop 434 is the old route of US 87 through northern Amarillo, formed on August 31, 1966. The highway is known locally as River Road.

Loop 434 begins at a junction with US 87 / US 287 near the Amarillo Zoo and Wonderland Park. The highway travels in a northern direction through suburban areas, with the route becoming more rural towards the north. Loop 434 ends at an intersection with the northbound frontage road of US 87 / US 287 near River Road High School.

Junction list

Dalhart

Business U.S. Highway 87-B is a loop of US 87 through Dalhart. It was formed in early 1954 as Loop 276, but always marked as a business route of US 87; in early 1991 the official designation was changed to Business US 87.

References

87
87 Texas
Texas Loops